Marek Šimko (born January 11, 1988) is a Slovak professional ice hockey goaltender who currently plays for HC 07 Detva of the Tipsport Liga.

Career
Šimko began his career with HKm Zvolen, playing for their U18 and U20 teams. During the 2005–06 season, he had a spell with HC '05 Banská Bystrica at U20 level, including one game for their senior team in the Slovak 1. Liga. He then had spells in the Czech Republic at U20 level for HC Dynamo Pardubice, Stadion Hradec Králové and HC Havířov, as well as nine games for HC Orlova in the Czech 2. Liga during the 2007–08 season.

Šimko returned to Slovakia in 2008, spending two seasons in the Slovak 1. Liga with HC 07 Detva and HK Trnava before joining MHC Martin of the Tipsport Liga in 2010. Šimko returned to HKm Zvolen in 2012 as their starting goaltender. After three seasons, he moved to Yertis Pavlodar of the Kazakhstan Hockey Championship for one season before returning to Slovakia for HC Nové Zámky for the 2016–17 season. He played just ten games before returning to Zvolen once more.

On June 11, 2018, Šimko joined HK Dukla Trenčín but was later traded to MHk 32 Liptovský Mikuláš on January 23, 2019, for Juraj Hollý. On May 23, 2019, Šimko rejoined HC 07 Detva, eight years after he last played for the team.

References

External links

 

1988 births
Living people
HC '05 Banská Bystrica players
HC 07 Detva players
HK Dukla Trenčín players
MHk 32 Liptovský Mikuláš players
MHC Martin players
HC Nové Zámky players
Ice hockey people from Bratislava
Slovak ice hockey goaltenders
Yertis Pavlodar players
HKM Zvolen players
Slovak expatriate ice hockey players in the Czech Republic
Slovak expatriate sportspeople in Kazakhstan
Expatriate ice hockey players in Kazakhstan